The Gumazing Gum Girl! (sometimes referred to simply as Gum Girl!) is an American children's superhero chapter book series by Rhode Montijo and co-authored by Luke Reynolds. It came out on August 20, 2013. The series is inspired by retro-styled superhero comic books and low-budget monster films.

Premise 
The series revolved around Gabby Gomez, a Hispanic gum-obsessed elementary school girl who becomes a sticky, stretchy superhero creature, Gum Girl, after accidentally electrocuting herself by blowing a bubble that was way too big. As Gum Girl, Gabby risks her life to fight criminals and save the day with her friends Ravi, Bubble Boy, Ninja-Rina, Robo-Chef and Brainstormer.

Characters 
 Gabriella "Gabby" Gomez / Gum Girl - A young girl who loves to chew gum, but her parents and teachers warned her against it, but she accidentally transforms herself into the sticky, stretchy superhero, Gum Girl. She usually wears a pink dress, a pink bow, and black mary-janes. As Gum Girl, her entire body was made up of chewing gum which gives her extreme “stretch ability.”
 Rico Gomez / Bubble Boy - Gabby's brother. He is the fan of Gum Girl and Ninja-Rina. He has ability to blow soap bubbles.
 Natalie Gooch / Brainstormer - A large tomboy, who bullies Gabby, then becomes Gabby's friend. She was a secondary protagonist of the series. She can also be a member of The Cocodrilos. She is shown as a wrestler and a researcher.
 Ninja-Rina - A third protagonist in the series. She is a masked ballerina with mad ninja skills. She knows jujitsu, basket-weaving, and ceramics. She is described as "the quick and graceful as ever."
 Robo-Chef - An arrogant pastry chef and inventor who hates gum. He serves as an anti-hero of the series. He pilots a gigantic one-eyed chef-shaped robot with an eggbeater for his left arm which squirts out peanut cooking oil.
 Mrs. Gomez - Gabby's mother. She punishes Gabby from chewing gum.
 Dr. Gomez - Gabby's father. He is a dentist of his own practice, Gomez Dental.
 Ms. Smoot - Gabby's teacher in Fillmore Elementary School.
 Jeffery Hansen / Hamster Hansen - Gabby's former substitute teacher in Fillmore Elementary School. When Mr. Chubby Cheeks bites him after he gets into the experimental green substance, Mr. Hansen becomes crazy by eating and drinking a lot, and he then transforms into the giant hamster monster. After he drank an antidote, he turns back into human.
 Ravi Rodriguez - A young little boy, who becomes a news reporter.
 Raul Gomez / Sol Azteca - Gabby's uncle, famous luchador, and archaeologist.
 The Everhander / The Underhander - Sol Azteca's old partner and rival. As the Underhander, he threatens to steal the Jade Jaguar. 
 Ninja-Rina's mother
 Police Chief Lily Yee
 Miguel, Alma, Lucas, and Litza/Kid Jaguar, Lightning Lobo, Narwhal Nina, and Pink Puma (also known as The Jaguares) - Sol Azteca's students.
 The Cocodrilos - The Everhander's students.
 The Mayor
 The Citizens
 Mr. Chubby Cheeks - Mr. Hansen's pet hamster.
 Ms. Jones - The librarian of Fillmore School.
 Principal Eskenas - The principal of Fillmore School.
 The Escaped Monkeys - The gag characters in the series. There are three monkeys that hold rubber spatulas and being escaped from the zoo after Gum Girl defeats Robo-Chef, starting in "Gum Luck".

Reception 
The book series was published to immediate critical mixed-to-acclaim. Some reviewers praised the book series as an exciting way to learn to read in English and in Spanish, particularly compared to the primers that it supplanted. Kirkus Reviews noted the book series' heavy use of humor and sequences. Kirkus wrote, "Perfectly paced and bursting with laughs....". BCCB wrote, "...a welcome addition to the ranks of early-elementary superkids."

Books

Book Packs

The Gumazing Gum Girl Pack! (2019)

Books Including 
Chews Your Destiny
Gum Luck
Popped Star

Animated series adaptation 
On May 27, 2021, according to voice actress Nancy Cartwright, DreamWorks Animation Television and CRE84U are developing an animated show based on the series.

Notes

References 

2013 children's books
Book series introduced in 2013
Series of children's books
Hyperion Books books
Novels set in California
Novels set in Mexico
2013 American novels
Fiction about shapeshifting
Superhero fiction